Lauda operated to the following destinations as of June 2020, when all Lauda flights were changed to be operated as a wetlease under Ryanair flight numbers.

List

References

Lists of airline destinations